The interrex (plural interreges) was literally a ruler "between kings" (Latin inter reges) during the Roman Kingdom and the Roman Republic. He was in effect a short-term regent.

History
The office of interrex was supposedly created following the death of Rome's first king Romulus, and thus its origin is obscured by legend. The Senate of the Roman Kingdom was at first unable to choose a new king. For the purpose of continuing the government of the city, the Senate, which then consisted of one hundred members, was divided into ten decuriae (groups of ten); and from each of these decuriae one senator was nominated as decurio. Each of the ten decuriones in succession held the regal power and its badges for five days as interrex; and if no king had been appointed at the expiration of fifty days, the rotation began anew. The period during which they exercised their power was called an interregnum, and on that occasion lasted for one year, after which Numa Pompilius was elected as the new king.

After the death of each subsequent king, an interrex was appointed by the Senate. His function was to call a meeting of the Comitia Curiata, which would elect a new king.

Under the Republic, interreges were appointed to hold the comitia for the election of the consuls when the consuls, through civil commotion or other cause such as death, had been unable to do so during their year of office. Each interrex held the office for only five days, as under the kings. During the brief interregnum, they cumulated most the original power of the king, or the power of the two consuls in the first years of the Republic. The comitia were, as a general rule, not held by the first interrex, who was originally the curio maximus, but more usually by the second or third; in one instance we read of an eleventh, and in another of a fourteenth interrex. The comitia to elect the first consuls were held by Spurius Lucretius Tricipitinus as interrex was also called praefectus urbis. The interreges under the Republic, at least from 482 BC, were elected from ex-consuls by the Senate, and were not confined to the decem primi or ten chief senators as under the kings. Plebeians, however, were not admissible to this office; and consequently when the Senate included plebeians, the patrician senators met together without the plebeian members to elect an interrex. For this reason, as well as on account of the influence which the interrex exerted in the election of the magistrates, we find that the tribunes of the plebs were strongly opposed to the appointment of an interrex. The interrex had jurisdictio. It is possible that interreges were the only magistrates exempted from the veto power of a tribune - which would be exceptional, since even dictators were usually subject to the veto.

Interreges continued to be appointed occasionally until the time of the Second Punic War. After that no interrex was appointed until the Senate, by command of Sulla, named L. Valerius Flaccus to hold the comitia for his election as Dictator in 82 BC. In 55 BC, another interrex was appointed to hold the comitia in which Pompey and Crassus were elected consuls. There were multiple interreges in 53 and 52 BC, the last known being Marcus Aemilius Lepidus (triumvir); in 52 an interrex held the comitia in which Pompey was appointed sole consul. The number of interreges during these two years was so high than Cicero ironised about it in a letter.

List of Roman interreges (509 - 52 BC) 
Unless otherwise indicated, the names and dates of the interreges are taken from Thomas Broughton's The Magistrates of the Roman Republic.

References

Sources

Ancient Roman titles
Roman Kingdom
Regents